The States of Guernsey established a Committee for Health & Social Care with effect from 1 May 2016.  Its remit is to protect, promote and improve the health and wellbeing of individuals and the community.

In May 2022 the committee proposed a plan to consider legalisation of cannabis.

Mental health
The proportion of islanders saying that they were suffering with mental health issues increased from 14% in 2019 to 29% in 2021.

Healthcare
Guernsey residents registered for the payment of income-related Social Security contributions are covered by the ‘Specialist Health Insurance Scheme’ provided by the Medical Specialist Group consultants. Primary care is provided on a private basis by three General Practice partnerships whilst some secondary care and specialist services are free.  The ambulance service is provided by Guernsey Ambulance and Rescue Service, a charitable company. This includes the non-emergency patient transport service.

The committee made a 15-year contract with IMS MAXIMS to provide an Electronic Patient Record System, the My eHealth record, for acute hospital and mental health services in 2022.  This will replace the existing TRAKCare 2012 system.

References

Health in Guernsey